KUKA is a German manufacturer of industrial robots and systems for factory automation. It is predominantly owned by the Chinese company Midea Group since 2016.

The KUKA Robotics Corporation has 25 subsidiaries, mostly sales and service subsidiaries, in the United States, Australia, Canada, Mexico, Brazil, China, Japan, South Korea, Taiwan, India, Russia and in various European countries.

KUKA Systems GmbH, a division of KUKA, is a supplier of engineering services and automated manufacturing systems, with around 3,900 employees in twelve countries globally. KUKA Systems’ plants/equipments are being used by automotive manufacturers, such as BMW, GM, Chrysler, Ford, Volvo, Volkswagen, Daimler AG and Valmet Automotive, and by manufacturers from other industrial sectors, such as Airbus, Astrium and Siemens. The range includes products and services for task automation in the industrial processing of metallic and non-metallic materials for various industries including automotive, energy, aerospace, rail vehicles, and agricultural machinery.

History 

The company was founded in 1898 in Augsburg, Germany, by Johann Josef Keller and Jacob Knappich. The acetylene factory Augsburg was founded in 1898 by Johann Josef Keller and Jakob Knappich for the production of low-cost domestic and municipal lighting, household appliances and automobile headlights. In 1905, the production was extended to the innovative autonomous welding equipment. After the First World War, Keller and Knappich resumed production of safety-, manual- and power-winches and began the manufacturing of large containers. As a result, the Bayerische Kesselwagen GmbH was formed in 1922. The new company was responsible for the development and production of superstructures for municipal vehicles (street cleaning machines, sewage trucks, garbage trucks). In 1927, this business division presented the first large garbage truck. The name KUKA came into being in the same year through the company's name at that time "Keller und Knappich Augsburg". In Hungary, the name - being prominently displayed on the first closed container garbage trucks - eventually became a generic trademark, and ultimately a synonym for trash cans.

Keller & Knappich GmbH merged with part of Industrie-Werke Karlsruhe AG to become Industrie-Werke Karlsruhe Augsburg Aktiengesellschaft, eventually KUKA (Keller und Knappich Augsburg) for short.

The development and manufacture of spot welding equipment began in 1936.  Three years later, KUKA already had more than 1,000 employees. After the major destruction of the company during the Second World War in 1945, KUKA started manufacturing welding machines and other small appliances again. With new products such as the double-cylinder circular knitting machine and the portable typewriter "Princess", KUKA introduced new industrial fields and gained independence from the supply sector.

In 1956, KUKA manufactured the first automatic welding system for refrigerators and washing machines and supplied the first multi-spot welding line to Volkswagen AG. Ten years later, the first friction welding machine went into production.

In 1967, the arc welding method was applied for the first time at KUKA. In 1971, the delivery of the first robotic welding system for the S-Class took place. A year later, the magnetic arc-welding machine came to the market.

In 1973, KUKA created its own industrial robot FAMULUS.  At that time, the company belonged to the Quandt group.

In 1978, beginning with the IR 601/60, robot production went into mass production

In 1980, the Quandt family withdrew and a publicly owned firm was established. In 1981, KUKA's main activities were grouped into three independent companies: the KUKA Schweissanlagen und Roboter GmbH, the KUKA Umwelttechnik GmbH and the KUKA Wehrtechnik GmbH, which was re-sold to Rheinmetall in 1999. Towards the end of 1982, the LSW Maschinenfabrik GmbH, Bremen became a subsidiary of KUKA.

In 1993, the first laser-roof-seam welding systems were manufactured. These welding systems were then further expanded to adhesive bonding and sealing technologies in the following year. Around the same time, KUKA took over the tools & equipment manufacturers Schwarzenberg GmbH and expanded its business to China and the USA in the following years.

In 1995, the company was split into KUKA Robotics Corporation and KUKA Schweißanlagen (now KUKA Systems), now both subsidiaries of KUKA AG. The company is a member of the Robotics Industries Association (RIA), of the International Federation of Robotics (IFR) and the German engineering association VDMA.
 
In 1996, KUKA Schweissanlagen GmbH became an independent company and, two years later, the leader among European welding equipment manufacturers. The supply of the first pressing tools for automobile side-walls made of high-strength steel began in 2002. The company launched the KUKA RoboScan with remote laser welding head in 2003. Since 2006, KUKA Systems is operating its own body shell factory in Toledo, Ohio, and produces the bodywork for the Jeep Wrangler by Chrysler.

In the course of internationalisation and expansion of business units and technologies such as reshaping, tooling, bonding, sealing, etc., KUKA Schweissanlagen GmbH became KUKA Systems GmbH in 2007. In 2010, KUKA presented a newly developed standardised cell concept for welding machines, KUKA flexibleCUBE.

In the automation sector, KUKA Systems offers standard and customised products for industrial production automation; joining technologies and component handling are amongst their activity. The technologies are tested and the production processes are fully optimised prior to the development. In addition, KUKA Systems offers engineering and individual counselling.

In June 2016, Midea Group offered to buy Kuka for about €4.5 billion ($5 billion). Midea completed the takeover bid in January 2017 by purchasing a 94.55% voting stake in the company.

In late 2017 Kuka announced that 250 employees of KUKA Systems were terminated. The management named trouble with projects as a reason.

Most robots are finished in "KUKA Orange" (the official corporate colour) or black.

Corporate structure 
The company is headquartered in Augsburg, Germany. As of December 2014, KUKA employed more than 13,000 workers. While previously emphasising customers in the automotive industry, the company has since expanded to other industries. It has 5 divisions:
Systems
Robotics
Swisslog Logistics Automation
Swisslog Healthcare
China

Notable milestones 
1971 – Europe's first welding transfer line built for Daimler-Benz.

1973 – The world's first industrial robot with six electromechanically driven axes, known as FAMULUS.

1976 – IR 6/60 – An utterly new robot type with six electromechanically driven axes and an offset wrist.

1989 – A new generation of industrial robots is developed – brushless drive motors for a low maintenance and a higher technical availability.

2004 – The first Cobot KUKA LBR 3 is released. This computer controlled lightweight robot is able to interact directly with humans without safety fences and was the result of a collaboration with the German Aerospace Center institute since 1995.

2007 – KUKA Titan – at the time, the biggest and strongest industrial robot with six axes, entered into the Guinness Book of World Records.

2010 – As the only robot family, the robot series KR QUANTEC completely covers the load range of 90 up to 300 kg with a reach of up to 3100 mm for the first time.

2012 – The new small robot series KR AGILUS is launched.

2014 – With a video released in March, the company gained some recognition with the general public. The video supposedly teased their new robot, specialised in Table Tennis and shows a match against Timo Boll, a German professional. It is however not a real match but a commercial with heavy CGI and the video received strong criticism from the table tennis community. The video has been viewed over 10 million times on YouTube and has won numerous awards.

2016 – It has been bought by the Chinese company Midea Group.

2017 – KUKA robots are heavily featured in a music video by artist Nigel Stanford.

System information and application areas

System information 
The KUKA system software is the operating software and the heart of the entire control. In it, all basic functions are stored which are needed for the deployment of the robot system.

Robots come with a control panel(the KCP, or KUKAControlPanel), also known as a teach pendant, that has a display and axis control buttons for A1-A6, as well an integrated 6D mouse, with which the robot can be moved in manual(teaching) mode. The pendant also allows the user to view and modify existing programs, as well as create new ones. To manually control the axes, an enabling switch (also called a dead man's switch) on the back of the pendant must be pressed halfway in for motion to be possible. The connection to the controller is a proprietary video interface and CAN bus for the safety interlock system and button operation.

A rugged computer located in the control cabinet communicates with the robot system via the MFC, which controls the real-time servo drive electronics. Servo position feedback is transmitted to the controller through the so-called DSE-RDW/RDC connection. The DSE board is in the control cabinet, usually located on or integrated into the MFC, the RDW/RDC board in located in the base of the robot.

The software comprises two elements running simultaneously – the user interface and program storage, which is run on Windows 95 for KRC1 and early KRC2 controllers, Windows XP Embedded for KRC2 controllers, and Windows 7 Embedded for KRC4 controllers, as well as VxWin, a KUKA-modified version of the VxWorks real-time OS for program control and motion planning, which communicates to the MFC.

The systems also contain standard PC peripherals, such as a CD-ROM drive(or 3.5" floppy on older controllers), USB ports, as well as a standard interface, either ISA or PCI/PCIe, for adding software and hardware options for industrial automation, such as Profibus, Interbus, DeviceNet and Profinet, and others.

Fields of application

Aerospace 

KUKA Systems supplied the TIG welding cell for the upper stage of the Ariane 5 launcher-rocket. 
TIG welding stands for tungsten inert gas welding and is a special form of arc welding and is one of the core activities of KUKA Systems. The company also provides apparatuses appliances for the construction of aircraft structural elements.

Boeing, SpaceX, Bell and Airbus are among KUKA Systems' respective customers.

Automotive 

The KUKA Systems portfolio includes the spectrum of production automation of joining and assembling of vehicle body structures:  from low-scale automated production facilities to highly flexible manufacturing systems; from production of individual equipments or subassemblies to the assembly of complete body structures and mechanical parts. Equipments for assembling discs and mounting systems for vehicle bodies and chassis (so-called “marriage”) or component installation are also available.

BMW, GM, Chrysler, Ford, Volvo,Hyundai, Volkswagen and Daimler AG are among the customers in this business sector.

Production of rail vehicles 

Manufacturers of rail vehicles are also among the customers of KUKA Systems e.g., for the construction of locomotives, subway wagons or in setting up of innovative and highly automated production lines for freight wagons.

Production of photovoltaic modules 

KUKA Systems offers solutions for every step of the photovoltaic module production – from brick-sawing to cell handling and cross-tie soldering to framing and packaging of modules.

Welding technology – General 

KUKA Systems represents itself in various other industrial sectors as well. A few examples out of many are the production of baby strollers or the production of white goods for BSH (Bosch und Siemens Hausgeräte GmbH).

Awards and certificates

Certificates 
 ISO 14001
 ISO 9001
 OHRIS – Occupational Safety Certificate
 VDA 6.4
 ISO 3834
 EN 9100

Application areas 
The industrial robots are used in many application areas, such as material handling, loading, and unloading of machines, palletising and depalletising, spot and arc welding. They are used in some large companies, predominantly in the automotive industry, but also in other industries such as the aerospace industry. Specific applications include:
 Transport industry:  for the transport of heavy loads, where their load capacity and free positioning are used. 
 Food and beverage industry:  for tasks such as loading and unloading of packaging machines, cutting meat, stacking and palletising, and quality control.
 Construction industry: e.g., for ensuring an even flow of material. 
 Glass industry:  used, for instance in the thermal treatment of glass and quartz glass in laboratory glass production, bending and forming operations. 
 Foundry and forging industry: the robots' heat and dirt resistance enable them to be used directly before, in and on the casting machines. They can also be used for operations such as deburring, grinding, or drilling, and for quality control.
 Wood industry: for grinding, milling, drilling, sawing, palletising or sorting applications.
 Metal processing: for operations such as drilling, milling, sawing or bending and punching. Industrial robots are used in welding, assembly, loading and unloading processes.
 Stone processing: the ceramic and stone industries use the industrial robots for stone cutting and shaping. KUKA has an exclusive partnership with BACA Systems to develop this technology.

KUKA Entertainment 
In 2001, KUKA formed a partnership with RoboCoaster Ltd to develop the world's first passenger-carrying industrial robot. The ride uses roller coaster-style seats attached to robotic arms and provides a roller coaster-like motion sequence through a series of programmable manoeuvres. Riders themselves can also program the motions of their ride. A second generation system, the RoboCoaster G2, was deployed at Universal's Islands of Adventure theme park in Orlando, Florida in 2010, in conjunction with Dynamic Structures. Harry Potter and the Forbidden Journey's seats are mounted on robotic arms, which are in turn mounted on a track allowing the arms to travel through the attraction while performing their movements in synchronisation with the ride's show elements (animated props, projection surfaces, etc.).

KUKA's partnership with RoboCoaster has also seen KUKA robots appear in some Hollywood films. In the James Bond film Die Another Day, in a scene depicting an ice palace in Iceland, NSA agent Jinx, played by Halle Berry, is threatened by laser-wielding robots. In the Ron Howard film The Da Vinci Code, a KUKA robot hands Tom Hanks’ character Robert Langdon a container containing a cryptex.

In 2007, KUKA introduced a simulator, based on the Robocoaster. RoboCoaster Ltd does not market this product. An installation of this version is The Sum Of All Thrills ride at EPCOT in Lake Buena Vista, Florida.

In recent years, KUKA robotic arms can be found on Royal Caribbean cruise liners at their bionic bars. The user selects their desired drink or creates a custom one on a tablet interface. The robotic arms then use an array of spirits, mixers and liqueurs to accurately and precisely craft the desired cocktail.

Gallery

See also 
Automation
KUKA Robot Language
Robotics

References

External links 

 
 KUKA Robotics Corp. (USA)
 KUKA LBR iiwa (Lightweight Cobot, intelligent industrial work assistant
  (YouTube)
 
 KUKA Systems GmbH
 KUKA Systems History

Companies based in Bavaria
Companies based in Augsburg
Robotics companies of Germany
Robotics companies of China
Multinational companies headquartered in China
Manufacturing companies established in 1898
Engineering companies of Germany
Engineering companies of China
Industrial robotics companies
Industrial machine manufacturers
Amusement ride manufacturers
1898 establishments in Germany
2016 mergers and acquisitions
Manufacturers of industrial automation
Quandt family